Albert Walder (born 9 November 1957, in Toblach) is a former Italian cross-country skier who competed from 1985 to 1988. He finished fifth in the 4 × 10 km relay at the 1988 Winter Olympics in Calgary.

Walder finished third in the 30 km class of the national men's championships of cross-country skiing. His best finish at the FIS Nordic World Ski Championships was eighth in the 50 km event at Oberstdorf in 1987. His best World Cup finish was in a 30 km event in Finland in 1987.

Cross-country skiing results
All results are sourced from the International Ski Federation (FIS).

Olympic Games

World Championships

World Cup

Season standings

Individual podiums
1 podium

Team podiums
 1 victory  
 2 podiums

References

External links

Olympic 4 x 10 km relay results: 1936-2002 

Cross-country skiers at the 1988 Winter Olympics
Italian male cross-country skiers
Living people
1957 births
People from Toblach
Olympic cross-country skiers of Italy
Germanophone Italian people
Sportspeople from Südtirol